Ladmanlow railway station was a minor railway station located on the Cromford and High Peak Railway near Buxton in Derbyshire. It was located on a line mostly used for mineral and quarry traffic. It opened to passengers in 1855 and closed in 1876 due to relatively but not uncommonly low usage. The goods station then closed in 1967 along with the rest of the line. Today, nothing remains of the station. It was also the terminus of the line originally for passengers until 1874 when it was extended to Buxton/Whaley Bridge. The trackbed now forms part of the A54 Road.

Route

References 

Disused railway stations in Derbyshire
Railway stations in Great Britain opened in 1855
Railway stations in Great Britain closed in 1876